Rakai is a town in the Central Region of Uganda. It is the site of the headquarters of Rakai District. Other towns in the district include Kalisizo, Kyotera Kakuuto and Mutukula.

Location
The coordinates of Rakai are 0°42'36.0"S, 31°24'18.0"E (Latitude:-0.7100, Longitude:31.4050).

Population
The 2002 national census put the population of the town at about 5,920. In 2010, the Uganda Bureau of Statistics (UBOS) estimated the mid-year population at 6,900. In 2011, UBOS estimated the mid-year population at 7,000. During the national population census conducted on 27 August 2014, the population was enumerated at 7,592.

In 2015, UBOS estimated the population of Rakai Town at 7,500. In 2020, the population agency estimated the mid-year population of the town at 8,500. UBOS calculated the annual growth rate of the town's population to average 2.53 percent, between 2015 and 2020.

Overview
Rakai is the headquarters of Rakai District, which in the early 1980s, was the epicenter and first distinct in Uganda to be affected by the AIDS epidemic.

Points of interest
The following additional points of interest are located within the town limits or close to its edges: (a) the offices of Rakai Town Council. (b) Rakai General Hospital, a 100-bed public hospital administered by the Rakai District local government. (c) Kamuswaga's Palace. (d) the offices of Rakai District Headquarters. (e) Rakai Health Sciences Program, a collaboration between researchers at Makerere University, Columbia University, and Johns Hopkins University, offering several different health services such as antiretroviral medications, circumcision, health education, and counseling as well as research in the field of HIV/AIDS.

Law enforcement
There is a police station in Rakai Town, administered and operated by the Uganda Police Force.

See also
 Kyotera
 Kalisizo
 Kakuuto
 Mutukula, Uganda

References

External links
Rakai District Homepage
Savers lose over sh2bn in Rakai, Sembabule SACCO fraud

Populated places in Central Region, Uganda
Cities in the Great Rift Valley
Rakai District